Plumptre is a surname. Notable people with the surname include:

 Adelaide Plumptre (1874–1948) (born Adelaide Proctor in England), Canadian activist, diplomat, and municipal politician in Toronto
 Annabella Plumptre (1769–1838), English writer and translator
 Anne Plumptre (1760–1818), English writer and translator
 Edward Hayes Plumptre (1821–1891), English divine and scholar born in London
 Frederick Charles Plumptre (1796-1870), Master of University College, Oxford
 Henry Plumptre Gipps (1813–1859), English lawyer and politician and member of Parliament
 John Pemberton Plumptre (1791–1864), British politician and member of Parliament